Whitiora Bridge is a prestressed concrete box girder bridge in Hamilton, New Zealand, spanning the Waikato River. It cost $2.35m, or $3.4m including the approach roads, and was opened at the start of a weekend of Centennial celebrations, on 11 February 1978, by representatives of Māori, Government and City, Dame Te Atairangikaahu, Venn Young and Ross Jansen.

Whitiora Bridge was also a name once used for the Victoria St bridge over the Waitawhiriwhiri Stream, just to the north in Whitiora.

The plans were shelved in 1933 when it was agreed to contribute 25% of the Fairfield Bridge cost.

The 1969 Hamilton Transportation Study proposed the bridge, which was designed by Murray North Partners (who also designed Pukete sewer bridge and Rangiriri bridge) and built by Rope Construction Ltd (who also built Rakaia Bridge). It is on Taupō pumice alluvium and carries Boundary Rd at a 25 degree skew over the river and River Rd. At 260m, that makes it significantly longer than 133m Claudelands, or 139m Fairfield, but the alignment minimised tree damage and lined up with a new extension of Boundary Rd from Mill St/Ulster St. The east end of Boundary Rd was shown on the 1879 map of Claudelands, In 1915 there was a complaint about its lack of drainage and, in 1933, Jesmond Park was laid out at its river end, later crossed by the bridge.

Sliding hinge joints in the landward spans give earthquake protection. Hydraulic shock transmission at the expansion joints will keep the sections of the bridge together in an earthquake.

Cycle Action Waikato complained in 2014, after the 2 traffic lanes, cycle tracks and footpath were converted to 3 traffic lanes and a footpath in 2006. The City's 1972 design brief, required up to 4 traffic lanes. The bridge carries about 200 cyclists a day and a clip-on cycle lane has been considered, with $1m budgeted for 2028.

During its design and construction the bridge was known as the Boundary Road Bridge and is still often referred to as such. 'Whitiora' was selected from a public suggestion, derived from 'Whiti', the call of the pipiwharauroa, and 'ora', meaning life, or health.

Miropiko pā, beside River Rd, just south of the bridge, is the best preserved of a number of Hamilton pā sites.

References

External links 
1976 photo of construction
1980s photo
 Google Street View from bridge

Bridges over the Waikato River
Bridges in Waikato
Buildings and structures in Hamilton, New Zealand